Fusinus thermariensis is a species of sea snail, a marine gastropod mollusk in the family Fasciolariidae, the spindle snails, the tulip snails and their allies.

Description
The length of the shell attains 54.7 mm.

Distribution
This marine species occurs off the New Hebrides.

References

 Hadorn R. & Fraussen K. 2006. Five new species of Fusinus (Gastropoda: Fasciolariidae) from western Pacific and Arafura Sea. Novapex 7(4): 91-102

thermariensis
Gastropods described in 2006